This is a list of gurus who gave teachings about the Path of Sound.

Notes and references

Lists of religious figures